Jefferson Alfredo Intriago Mendoza (born 4 June 1996) is an Ecuadorian professional footballer who plays for Liga MX club Mazatlán.

Club career
He began his career with L.D.U. Quito in 2014.

International career
Intriago made his debut for Ecuador on October 5, 2017 against Chile.

Career statistics

Honours
LDU Quito
Ecuadorian Serie A: 2018

References

External links
Jefferson Intriago profile at Federación Ecuatoriana de Fútbol 

1996 births
Living people
Association football midfielders
Ecuadorian footballers
Ecuadorian expatriate footballers
Ecuador international footballers
Ecuador under-20 international footballers
Ecuadorian Serie A players
Liga MX players
L.D.U. Quito footballers
FC Juárez footballers
People from Manabí Province
2015 South American Youth Football Championship players
2019 Copa América players
Expatriate footballers in Mexico